A number of standards specific to military organizations exist for trailer connectors, the electrical connectors between vehicles and the trailers they tow that provide a means of control for the trailers. These can be found on surplus equipment sold for civilian use.

NATO 

NATO uses a 12-pin connector according to STANAG 4007. However, note that there are often deviations from the standard depending on which country it is applied, which means that the table below may not be accurate.

The following supplementary information exists for the connector:

Some documentation indicates that the terminal A, C and H must be interconnected, this will conflict with the definition of Blackout and Convoy modes according to STANAG 4007 when these pins have different purposes. To clarify:
 Pin A is for activation of so-called Blackout Mode. It turns off all the lights except convoy lighting if it is active. The lighting inside the vehicle shall also be extinguished if it is not specifically shaded.
 Pin C is for Convoy Lamps, which is the special convoy lighting, corresponding to the tail lights, to be used while driving in the dark.
 Pin H is for rear fog light and the rear fog light shall also be disabled when pin A is active.

Swedish Armed Forces 

This is physically the same connector as the NATO connector, but with completely different wiring. This means mixing this up with the STANAG 4007 wiring runs the risk for short circuits and blown fuses.

The following supplementary information exists for the connector:

See also

 Trailer connector
 Trailer connectors in Australia
 Trailer connectors in Europe
 ISO standards for trailer connectors
 Trailer connectors in North America

References

Symbol Guide 

Military vehicles
Automotive electrics
Trailers
DC power connectors